Kim Kyung-ran (born September 28, 1977) is a South Korean television personality and former announcer. She was a cast member in the reality show The Genius: Rules of the Game, and is a cast member in the reality show The Genius: Grand Final.

Filmography

Television shows

References

External links

1977 births
Living people
South Korean announcers
South Korean television presenters
South Korean women television presenters
Ewha Womans University alumni